Chelisad (also Romanized as Chelīsād) is a village in Dehdez Rural District, Dehdez District, Izeh County, Khuzestan Province, Iran. At the 2006 census, its population was 348, in 63 families.

References 

Populated places in Izeh County